Tommie Lee Guthrie (December 27, 1937 – June 14, 2013), known professionally as Tom Tall, was an American rockabilly singer popular in the 1950s.

Biography
He was born in Amarillo, Texas and discovered at a talent show by record label owner Fabor Robison. He often sang duets with Ginny Wright, and later recorded for Crest and Decca Records where he met Eddie Cochran, a session musician for the label.

In the 1960s, he was on the Chart label and had a comeback hit with Wright.  While he was with Chart, Tall made a series of singles including a song called "Walk Tall" which was tailor-made because of his professional name. It was picked up in the United Kingdom by Irish singer Val Doonican, who made the top five with the song.

Tall retired in Los Angeles, where he was rediscovered by the German label Bear Family Records, which issued albums in the 1980s by Tall and Wright. A recent CD by Bear Family was shared equally between both artists.

Tom Tall died on June 14, 2013, at age 75 in Las Vegas, Nevada.

Singles

References

External links
Tom Tall biography

1937 births
2013 deaths
Musicians from Amarillo, Texas
Abbott Records artists
Crest Records artists
Decca Records artists
American country singer-songwriters
American rockabilly musicians
American male singer-songwriters
Singer-songwriters from Texas
Country musicians from Texas